Jericó is a town, municipality and Catholic bishopric in the Colombian department of Antioquia. It is part of the subregion of Southwestern Antioquia. The distance reference from Medellín city, the capital of the department, is 104 km (64.6 miles).

History 
The town was founded on September 28, 1850, by pioneer Santiago Santamaría. It was established as municipality on 1851. During a territorial rearrangement on the country on 1908, Jericó became the capital of the homonymous department until 1911.

In 2013, Jericó became the third municipality in Antioquia to be named a Pueblo Patrimonio (heritage town) of Colombia.

Religion 
Its Catedral de Nuestra Señora de las Mercedes, dedicated to Our Lady of Mercy, is the episcopal cathedral see of the Roman Catholic Diocese of Jericó (founded 1915, when the first cathedral was built). Due to some damages, the first church had to be replaced by the present cathedral, since 1949. The town is the birthplace of Laura of Saint Catherine of Siena, canonized as saint by Pope Francis on 2013.

Notable people from Jericó 
 Héctor Abad Gómez
 Francisco Luis Lema
 Manuel Mejía Vallejo
 Laura of Saint Catherine of Siena
 Jesusita Vallejo
 José Restrepo Jaramillo

Sites of Interest 
 Botanical Garden
 Cristo Salvador viewpoint
 Bomarzo cultural center
 Cerro Las Nubes natural reserve and viewpoint
 Casa Museo de Santa Laura
 Centro de Historia
 Museo Antropologico y de Arte (MAJA)
 Museo de Arte Religioso

Sources and external links 
 GCatholic - cathedral, with Google satellite picture
 GCatholic - diocese, with Google map and satellite picture

References

Municipalities of Antioquia Department